Fiona Karen Ritchie MBE (born 1960) is a Scottish radio broadcaster best known as the producer and host of The Thistle & Shamrock, an hour-long Celtic music program that airs weekly throughout the United States on National Public Radio (NPR).  She also curates ThistleRadio, a 24/7 web-based music channel devoted to new and classic music from Celtic roots, and is co-author of The New York Times Best Seller Wayfaring Strangers.

The radio program has won numerous awards since its inception in 1981, offering a fusion of traditional and contemporary Celtic sounds, interwoven with interviews, in-studio performances and Ritchie's own trademark commentary in her "soft Scots" dialect.

Early years 
Ritchie was born and raised in Scotland, where she went to the University of Stirling for her undergraduate education. While there, she was invited to spend one semester in North Carolina in the United States, which was when she first heard NPR.  After graduating in Scotland, she returned to North Carolina and, although initially pursuing post-graduate research, was hired by WFAE FM, the NPR station in Charlotte, to oversee fundraising and promotion efforts.  In her early years, Ritchie guest hosted live radio shows featuring everything from big band to classical music, also producing and presenting many live concerts.

WFAE was a new station open to new ideas, and in 1981 Ritchie began a weekly hour of Celtic music for its local audience.  The Thistle & Shamrock was picked up for national broadcast less than two years after this debut.  The program's national following grew quickly, and it was soon established as one of NPR's most widely heard and best-loved music offerings.  During her years based in North Carolina, Ritchie visited radio stations coast-to-coast across the US, presenting live broadcasts and events, and in 1989 and 1990, traveled to 22 US cities with The Thistle & Shamrock Concert Tour.

Return to Scotland 
Fiona Ritchie came full circle to re-settle and create her radio programs at home in Scotland.  On numerous return trips to the United States, she has visited and raised funds for NPR member stations everywhere from Louisiana to Alaska, and hosted festival concerts from Wolf Trap National Park for the Performing Arts to Chicago's Grant Park. Along the way she has forged a strong association with the United States, and made a unique contribution to the American airwaves.

In the UK, Fiona Ritchie has presented numerous programs for BBC Radio Scotland and BBC Radio 2, launching the Radio Scotland world music series "Celtic Connections" in 1993.  She has produced and presented many live concert performances and broadcasts, including a musical event for Prince Charles in 2001 at Holyrood Palace in Edinburgh, and has acted in an advisory capacity for arts organisations in the US and UK, including serving on the Scottish advisory committee for the British Council.

In 2006, Ritchie launched Thistlepod, a free podcast from NPR, which ran until her radio programs became available to stream via NPR Music and Ritchie's ThistleRadio website.  Her partnership with NPR Music gave rise to ThistleRadio in 2012, a 24/7 web-based music channel devoted to new and classic music from Celtic roots, now hosted by SomaFM internet radio. Ritchie has also produced several CD compilations and authored a 2005 volume on Celtic music for the NPR Curious Listener's Guide book series.

In 2014, Wayfaring Strangers: The Musical Voyage from Scotland and Ulster to Appalachia, her major book, with CD, which was named after The Wayfaring Stranger folk song, was published by UNC Press.  The book was co-authored by Doug Orr with a Foreword by Dolly Parton.  Wayfaring Strangers appeared on The New York Times Best Seller list in two different categories.

Awards and honours 
Ritchie's awards include six World Medals from the New York Festivals International Competition for Radio Programming, and a Flora Macdonald Award from St. Andrews University (North Carolina), which also conferred upon her the degree of honorary doctorate.  Hundreds of Thistle & Shamrock tapes and vinyl albums, along with concert recordings, playlists, newsletters, and related materials are now part of a working archive in the Scottish Heritage Center at St. Andrews University (North Carolina).   The archive is open to anyone interested in studying the rich heritage of Celtic music.  Ritchie also serves on the Advisory Board of the Swannanoa Gathering folk arts workshops at Warren Wilson College in North Carolina.

In 2003 the Smithsonian Center for Folklife and Cultural Heritage honoured her for "creating an on-air community, serving as a musical ambassador, and connecting listeners with the best of traditional and contemporary artistry.”

Ritchie was appointed Member of the Order of the British Empire (MBE) in the 2014 Birthday Honours for services to broadcasting and traditional Scottish music. In 2016 she received the Hamish Henderson Award for Services to Traditional Music, named for the influential folklorist, poet, songwriter and scholar who died in 2002.  The award is presented annually to an individual who has made a substantial difference to the Scottish traditional music world.  Upon receiving this honour, Ritchie was also inducted into Scottish Traditional Music Hall of Fame.

Ritchie's ThistleRadio music channel on SomaFM was awarded Best Music Show: Country/Folk/Blues in the 2017 Online Radio Awards presented by the British streaming service Mixcloud. In 2018, Folk Alliance International inducted Ritchie into their Folk DJ Hall of Fame.

References

External links 
Thistle Radio – official site
The Thistle & Shamrock via streaming audio
Thistle Radio on SomaFM
"Hamish Henderson Services to Traditional Music Award"

1960 births
Living people
American information and reference writers
American writers about music
American women podcasters
American podcasters
NPR personalities
Scottish expatriates in the United States
Scottish radio presenters
Alumni of the University of Stirling
Members of the Order of the British Empire
21st-century American women